Jüri Tamm (5 February 1957 – 22 September 2021) was an Estonian hammer thrower and politician. Representing the USSR, he won a bronze medal in the 1980 and 1988 Summer Olympics and a silver medal at the 1987 World Championships in Athletics. He set the world record for the hammer in 1980.

Athletic career
Tamm held the world record in hammer throw with 80.46 metres for a brief period in 1980, although his record was soon overcome by teammates Yuriy Sedykh and Sergey Litvinov. Tamm's personal best throw, 84.40 metres, was achieved in 1984.

He finished 5th at the 1992 Summer Olympics, now representing the restored independent Estonia.

Political career
In 1998 Tamm entered political life. He was elected three times into the Parliament of Estonia in 1999–2003 (the Economic Affairs Committee), in 2003–2007 (the Economic Affairs Committee) and in 2007–2011 (the Economic Affairs Committee and European Union Affairs Committee, Security Authorities Surveillance Select Committee in Parliament of Estonia), for the Social Democratic Party. In 2010 he withdrew from the Social Democratic Party (SDE) and left politics.

He was the Vice President of the Estonian Olympic Committee from 2001 until 2008, co-founder of the World Olympians Association (WOA) and from 1998 to 2021, the Chair of Eesti Sportlaste Ühendus (Estonian Olympians Union), from 2001 to 2005 Chairman of the European Olympic Committees (EOC) Athletes’ Commission, member of EOC Executive Board. From 2012 to 2015 he was Chief of Staff in Ukraine National Olympic Committee and from May 2016 till 2021, the Vice President of the Estonian Olympic Committee and Chair of the European Olympic Committees EU Commission. He was co-founder and head of the Electric Marathon, Pan-European annual race for battery electric vehicles (BEV) under the patronage of His Serene Highness Prince of Monaco Albert II and from
2007–2021 Honorary Consul of the Principality of Monaco in Estonia.

He was also awarded 2003 Orden del Merito Civil, “Cruz de Oficial” Spain, 2006 "White Star Orden” IV, Estonia.

References

External links

 
 
 Riigikogu profile

1957 births
2021 deaths
Sportspeople from Pärnu
People from Pärnu
Members of the Riigikogu, 1999–2003
Members of the Riigikogu, 2003–2007
Members of the Riigikogu, 2007–2011
Estonian male hammer throwers
Soviet male hammer throwers
Athletes (track and field) at the 1980 Summer Olympics
Athletes (track and field) at the 1988 Summer Olympics
Olympic athletes of the Soviet Union
Olympic bronze medalists for the Soviet Union
Athletes (track and field) at the 1992 Summer Olympics
Athletes (track and field) at the 1996 Summer Olympics
Olympic athletes of Estonia
Social Democratic Party (Estonia) politicians
World Athletics Championships medalists
Estonian masters athletes
World record holders in masters athletics
Estonian referees and umpires
Estonian sportsperson-politicians
Medalists at the 1988 Summer Olympics
Medalists at the 1980 Summer Olympics
Olympic bronze medalists in athletics (track and field)
Universiade medalists in athletics (track and field)
21st-century Estonian politicians
Universiade gold medalists for the Soviet Union
Recipients of the Order of the White Star, 4th Class
Medalists at the 1981 Summer Universiade
Medalists at the 1983 Summer Universiade